The 2013–14 SV Wehen Wiesbaden season is the 89th season in the club's football history. In 2013–14 the club plays in the 3. Liga, the third tier of German football. It is the club's fifth season in this league, having been relegated from the 2. Bundesliga in 2009.

Off-season
Wehen made 9 signings over the summer period, including Maximilian Ahlschwede from rivals Kickers Offenbach, Julian Grupp from SG Sonnenhof Großaspach, Stephan Gusche from Hansa Rostock, as well as Alex Nandzik from Fortuna Düsseldorf, Tobias Jänicke from Dynamo Dresden, Maik Vetter and Luca Schnellbacher from Eintracht Frankfurt, Marco Königs from Preußen Münster and Sascha Wolfert from 1.FC Kaiserslautern. They also signed former Slovenian U-21 footballer Denis Perger on loan from SC Freiburg.

SVWW also lost Dominik Stroh-Engel, Zlatko Janjic, Sven Schimmel, and Pascal Bieler from the first team over the summer.

Fixtures

Pre Season

3rd Liga
SV Wehen Wiesbaden began the 2013-14 season away to 1.FC Saarbrücken on 20 July.

Hesse Cup
Wehen entered the 69th edition of the Hesse Cup in the Round of 16, with the winners qualifying for the 2014-15 DFB Pokal.

Squad

Squad information

Season Statistics
As of 29 July 2013

|-
! colspan="12" style="background:#dcdcdc; text-align:center"| Goalkeepers

|-
! colspan="12" style="background:#dcdcdc; text-align:center"| Defenders

|-
! colspan="12" style="background:#dcdcdc; text-align:center"| Midfielders

|-
! colspan="12" style="background:#dcdcdc; text-align:center"| Forwards

|}

Results summary

Points breakdown

Points at home: 17 
Points away from home: 14 

Points against promoted teams: 4 
Points against relegated teams: 4

6 points: 1.FC Saarbrücken
4 points: 
3 points: SV Stuttgarter Kickers, Hallescher FC, Wacker Burghausen, RB Leipzig, MSV Duisburg, Chemnitzer FC
2 points:
1 point: SC Preußen Münster, Holstein Kiel, VfB Stuttgart II, 1.FC Heidenheim, SSV Jahn Regensburg, Borussia Dortmund II, SV Darmstadt 98
0 points: Rot-Weiß Erfurt, SV Elversburg, VfL Osnabrück, SpVgg Unterhaching, Hansa Rostock

Biggest & smallest
Biggest home win: 4-0 vs. SV Stuttgarter Kickers, 27 July 2013 
Biggest home defeat: 0-2 vs. SpVgg Unterhaching, 19 October 2013 - 1-3 vs. Hansa Rostock, 7 December 2013
Biggest away win: 1-3 vs. Wacker Burghausen, 24 August 2013 
Biggest away defeat: 3-0 vs. Rot-Weiß Erfurt, 3 September 2013 - SV Elversburg, 21 September 2013

Biggest home attendance: 4790 vs. MSV Duisburg, 8 September 2013 
Smallest home attendance: 2613 vs. SSV Jahn Regensburg, 2 November 2013 
Biggest away attendance: 8000 vs. Hallescher FC, 10 August 2013 - 1. FC Heidenheim, 26 October 2013 
Smallest away attendance: 600 vs. SV Elversburg, 21 September 2013

Results by match

Goal Scorers

All competitions

2013–14 3. Liga

2013-14 Hesse Cup

|-  style="text-align:left; background:#dcdcdc;"
| colspan="12"|Last updated: 21 December 2013
|-

References

Wehen Wiesbaden
SV Wehen Wiesbaden seasons